Charles Meredith may refer to:
Charles Meredith (politician) (1811–1880), politician in colonial Tasmania, Australia
Charles Meredith (banker) (1854–1928), Canadian banker
Charles Meredith (actor) (1894–1964), American actor
Sir Charles Warburton Meredith (1896−1977), British Royal Air Force officer

See also
Charles Meredyth (disambiguation)